Sotta is a commune in the French department of Corse-du-Sud, on the island of Corsica. It is one of communes in the canton of Grand Sud.

Geography
The territory includes part of  Mount Cagna to the northwest; the remainder is in a plain scattered with hamlets, vines and groves of Cork Oak and Eucalyptus.

Population

Transportation
The village is near the airport at Figari.

It has been used as a special stage in the Tour de Corse.

See also
Communes of the Corse-du-Sud department

References

Communes of Corse-du-Sud